
Gostyń County is a unit of territorial administration and local government (powiat) in Greater Poland Voivodeship, west-central Poland. It came into being on January 1, 1999, as a result of the Polish local government reforms passed in 1998.

As of 2006 its total population is 75,683, out of which the population of Gostyń is 20,588, that of Krobia is 4,022, that of Poniec is 2,875, that of Borek Wielkopolski is 2,486, that of Pogorzela is 1,974, and the rural population is 43,738.

Neighbouring counties
Gostyń County is bordered by Śrem County to the north, Jarocin County to the east, Krotoszyn County to the south-east, Rawicz County to the south, Leszno County to the west and Kościan County to the north-west.

Administrative division
The county is subdivided into seven gminas (five urban-rural and two rural). These are listed in the following table, in descending order of population.

References
Polish official population figures 2006

 
Land counties of Greater Poland Voivodeship